Antictenia is a genus of moths in the family Geometridae.

Species
 Antictenia punctunculus (Lucas, 1892)
 Antictenia torta Prout, 1921

References
 Antictenia at Markku Savela's Lepidoptera and Some Other Life Forms

Oenochrominae
Geometridae genera